The Central Avenue Bridge is two level deck truss bridge over the Kansas River in Kansas City, Kansas.
It was built in 1918, and rebuilt in 1984. It is just south of the Kansas City Southern Bridge, and north of the I-670 Viaduct over the Kansas River.

Bridges over the Kansas River
Bridges in Kansas City, Kansas
Transportation in the Kansas City metropolitan area
Road bridges in Kansas
Truss bridges in the United States